Congo Express is a 1939 German adventure film directed by Eduard von Borsody and starring Marianne Hoppe, Willy Birgel. and René Deltgen.

The film's sets were designed by the art director Franz Koehn. Location shooting took place on railway lines close to Celle.

Cast

References

Bibliography

External links

1939 adventure films
1930s romance films
German adventure films
German romance films
Films of Nazi Germany
Films directed by Eduard von Borsody
Films with screenplays by Ernst von Salomon
UFA GmbH films
German black-and-white films
1930s German-language films
1930s German films